Mezhdunarodnaya ( - International) is a northern terminus of one of the 2 branches of the Filyovskaya Line of the Moscow Metro. The station was built as part of the second stage and completed the branch of the Filyovskaya Line into the Moscow International Business Center (Moscow-City). It opened on 30 August 2006.

The station, designed by architects A.Orlov and A.Nekrasov, features a deep-level column tri-vault design.  However, unlike the standard Moscow sizes, the platform length is shortened from 162 to 118 metres, while the sizes of both the central and platform vaults have also been reduced from the standard 9 to 7.5 metres. As a result, the station has sizes similar to those on the London Underground stations. Also, Mezhdunarodnaya is the only deep-level station that features a curved platform.

Decoratively the station has a modern "high-tech" design that blends with the skyscraper landscape of the Moscow-City. The design consists of white marble and plastic panels, a dark granite floor, and metallic interpylon slabs. The vestibule of the station is located under Moscow's internal motorway, the Third Ring. The lobby contains modernized turnstiles.

Moscow Metro stations
Railway stations in Russia opened in 2006
Moscow International Business Center
Filyovskaya Line
Railway stations located underground in Russia